Alpgau (also Albgau) was a territory of Alemannia and the Duchy of Swabia during the 8th to 12th centuries.
It comprised St. Blaise in what is now the Waldshut district of Baden-Württemberg.

It is not to be confused with Alpengau, now known as Allgäu.

References

Geography of Baden-Württemberg